Charles Hines may refer to:
 Charles A. Hines (1935–2013), American soldier and educator
 Charles Hines (director) (1892–1936), American actor and film director
 Charles Hines (died 1897), executed Australian prisoner
 Charles Cragg Hines (born 1945), American journalist
 Charles Hines, fictional character, London debut role, c. 1905,  of John Barrymore

See also
Charles Heinz (disambiguation)